Tunnsjø Chapel is a chapel of the Church of Norway in Lierne municipality in Trøndelag county, Norway. It is located in the village of Tunnsjø senter. It is an annex chapel for the Nordli parish which is part of the Namdal prosti (deanery) in the Diocese of Nidaros. The white, wooden, Neo-Gothic church was built in a long church style in 1876 using plans drawn up by the architect Carl Julius Bergstrøm. The chapel seats about 100 people. The church was consecrated on 22 April 1876.

See also
List of churches in Nidaros

References

Lierne
Churches in Trøndelag
Wooden churches in Norway
19th-century Church of Norway church buildings
Churches completed in 1876
1876 establishments in Norway
Long churches in Norway